The Ministry of Housing, Spatial Planning and the Environment ( or VROM) was a Dutch ministry. It was responsible for policies on public housing, spatial planning, the environment and the housing of national government agencies. It was merged with the Ministry of Transport, Public Works and Water Management into the new Ministry of Infrastructure and the Environment on 14 October 2010.

History

The Ministry of VROM was established as the ministry of Reconstruction and Public Housing (Dutch: Wederopbouw en Volkshuisvesting) in 1947, to coordinate the reconstruction of the Netherlands after the Second World War. Its main goal in this period was to build enough housing. In 1958 the ministry was renamed Public Housing and Construction Industry (Dutch: Volkshuisvesting en Bouwnijverheid).

In the 1965 the ministry was renamed Public Housing and Spatial Planning (Dutch: Volkshuisvesting en Ruimtelijke Ordening). Spatial planning and land management became more important. The high level of population growth in the densely populated Netherlands made centralized coordination of land use necessary. The ministry began to publish coordinate the land use policies of provinces and municipalities. Urban renewal also became an important issue for the ministry.

In 1982 the ministry was renamed Public Housing and Spatial Planning and the Environment. The environment has previously been a part of the portfolio of the Ministry of Health, Welfare and Sport. With rising environmental consciousness the environment became the most important issue for the ministry. The ministry also bears responsibility for international environmental policy. Since 2006 the Netherlands Environmental Assessment Agency is an agency of this ministry.

Ministers
First Lubbers cabinet
Pieter Winsemius, 1982-1986 (VVD)
State secretary: Gerrit Brokx (CDA)

Second Lubbers cabinet
Ed Nijpels, 1986-1989 (VVD)
State secretary: Enneüs Heerma (CDA)

Third Lubbers cabinet
Hans Alders, 1989-1994 (PvdA)
State secretary: Enneüs Heerma (CDA)

First Kok cabinet
Margreeth de Boer, 1994-1998 (PvdA)
State secretary: Dick Tommel (D66)

Second Kok cabinet
Jan Pronk, 1998-2002 (PvdA)
State secretary: Johan Remkes (VVD)

First Balkenende cabinet
Henk Kamp, 2002-2003 (VVD)
State secretary: Pieter van Geel (CDA)

Second Balkenende cabinet
Sybilla Dekker, 2003-2006 (VVD)
State secretary: Pieter van Geel (CDA)

Third Balkenende cabinet
Sybilla Dekker, 2006 (VVD), resigned
Pieter Winsemius, 2006–2007
State secretary: Pieter van Geel (CDA)

Fourth Balkenende cabinet
Jacqueline Cramer, 2007-2010 (PvdA)
Tineke Huizinga, 2010 (ChristenUnie)
Ella Vogelaar, 2007-2008 (PvdA); Minister without Portfolio for Housing, Neighbourhoods and Integration (resigned)
Eberhard van der Laan, 2008-2010 (PvdA); Minister without Portfolio for Housing, Neighbourhoods and Integration
Eimert van Middelkoop, 2010 (ChristenUnie); Minister without Portfolio for Housing, Neighbourhoods and Integration

External links
Ministry of Housing, Spatial Planning and the Environment

Ministries disestablished in 2010
Netherlands, Housing, Spatial Planning and the Environment
Defunct environmental agencies
1947 establishments in the Netherlands
Ministries disestablished in 2010
Defunct organisations based in the Netherlands